Basharovo is a rural locality (a village) in Cheremushksoye Rural Settlement, Kotlassky District, Arkhangelsk Oblast, Russia. The population was 2 as of 2012. There are 3 streets.

Geography 
Basharovo is located on the Basharovka River, 18 km south of Kotlas (the district's administrative centre) by road. Chupanovo is the nearest rural locality.

References 

Rural localities in Kotlassky District